The Kwaya are a Bantu ethnolinguistic group based in the Mara Region of northern Tanzania, on the southeastern shore of Lake Victoria.  In 1987 the Kwaya population was estimated to number 102,000.

References

Ethnic groups in Tanzania
Indigenous peoples of East Africa